A Richer Vein is the debut album by Cornish folk band Dalla. It was released shortly after the demise of Sowena, and affirmed Dalla as more than a watered down version of their previous achievements.

The record can be noted for its expanse of original material as opposed to the mostly traditional songs Sowena played, and the reintroduction of the Cornish language into folk music. The record poses the introduction of Neil Davey, and establishes the "Dalla Trio" that are often seen as the definitive line-up of the band. It is often perceived to be the stronger of the two records with this line-up.

Track listing
 "Trelva/Turning Point" – 5:37
 "The Streams Of Lovely Nancy" – 2:54
 "Yard Of Card" – 2:55
 "Over Easy" – 5:37
 "Hoer Oves An Moar/Sister Over The Sea" – 1:35
 "Rebellyes/King Harry Ferry" – 5:41
 "New World" – 3:52
 "Saltash" – 5:11
 "St. IvesFer Moh/Pig Fair" – 3:16
 "Truro" – 4:20
 "Nine Brave Boys" – 5:27
 "Mar Euhall Ew An Gweeth/The Trees They Are So High" – 3:24
 "Coer Elarth/Choir Of Angels" – 11:25

Personnel 

 Hilary Coleman – clarinet, bass clarinet, vocals
 Neil Davey – fiddle, bouzouki
 Bec Applebee – vocals, percussion
 Steve Hunt – vocals, guitar, crowdy crawn
 Éric Beaumin – bombarde

References

Dalla albums
2001 debut albums
Self-released albums